The podstakannik (literally "thing under the glass"), or tea glass holder, is a holder with a handle, most commonly made of metal that holds a drinking glass (stakan). Their primary purpose is to be able to hold a very hot glass of tea, which is usually consumed right after it is brewed. The stability of the glass on the table is also significantly improved. It is a traditional way of serving and drinking tea in Russia, Ukraine, Belarus, and other Slavic states.

History 
Podstakanniks appeared in Russian tea culture in the late 18th century, when drinking tea became common in Russia. Very soon they became not just practical utensils, but also works of art, just like samovars that were used for boiling water. Expensive podstakanniks for the rich and the elite were made of silver; however, they were not very practical, since they would get quite hot very quickly due to the high thermal conductivity of silver. By the 20th century, podstakanniks became very widespread. They were found extremely useful on railroads, as tea was served in moving carriages that were shaking. A bare glass was more likely to fall, scalding people with hot tea. The Russian railroads still use the podstakannik extensively in sleeper carriages.

Production 
In the Soviet Union they were made mostly from nickel silver, cupronickel, and other alloys with nickel, silver, or gold plating. Though in modern times, simple tea cups or mugs are typically used by Russians at home, podstakanniks continue to be widely used for serving tea on the Russian Railways, since they provide more safety while drinking or carrying tea on a moving train. Most Russian tea glass holders have been produced by a plant located in Kolchugino, Vladimir Oblast. Kolchug-Mizar, its name deriving from its location and the alloy melchior, continues to be the main glass holder producer to this day. Some podstakanniks depict architecture, famous people, famous dates in history, cities, etc., giving a good general survey of Russian and Soviet history.

Some similar tea glass holders can occasionally be seen in the West in tea houses and pubs; they are however usually of much simpler design (made of either stainless steel bent wire or even of some plastic material) than those seen in Russia (and in the former USSR).

See also
Tea 
Tea culture
Russian tea culture
Turkish tea, a style of tea served in clear glasses without a holder
Zarf

References

External links

Teaware
Russian inventions